Victor Vincente of America also known as VVA, born as Michael Beckwith Hiltner (born March 7, 1941), is an American author, poet, designer, and cyclist credited with being a creator of the :mountain bike.

Athlete

Road racing
Victor began riding and racing with the Santa Monica Cycling Club on a road bike at the age of 16 in Santa Monica, California. He entered his first competition on the Fourth of July, 1957, under his birth name of Michael Beckwith Hiltner. He was first Junior (under 17 years of age) to reach the finish line at the 50-mile southern California road racing championships at the end of that summer, with only one rider, Bob Teztlaff, a Senior, ahead of him. The momentum continued to build as he eventually made it to the 1959 Tour du St-Laurent in Canada where he won four of the ten stages and the general classification (GC). This set the stage for Victor’s international recognition.

From this auspicious beginning he went on to an eleven-year cycling career. Highlights include a national road cycling championships title, four California titles, a North America hillclimb championship title, berths on two USA Olympics teams, two Pan American Games teams, and victories in Italy. At the 1963 Pan American Games in São Paulo, Brazil, he met Neide Marchena, a Brazilian telephone operator. Although they did not speak each other's language, they became engaged the same year, and married shortly after that.

Victor was inducted into the Modern 1945-1975 Competitor category of the United States Bicycling Hall of Fame in 2001.

Double-transcontinental record and the VVA name
In 1974, Victor established the double-transcontinental record by cycling from Santa Monica, California to Atlantic City, New Jersey, and back to Santa Monica, covering the distance in 36 days, 8hours. This achievement prompted him to change his name, and so he adopted the title Victor Vincente of America, two ways of saying "winning."

Mountain biking
During a recreational ride one day in 1978, descending a residential canyon road into the San Fernando Valley, in southern California, the pavement unexpectedly ended and Victor found himself riding down a dirt road. A sharp rock blew his front tire within a mile, and it was this upset that led to his independent development of bicycles suited for dirt roads and trails.

In 1980, Victor established the Reseda to the Sea event which still carries on today, the most recent edition being on March 9, 2019. He also promoted Puerco!, Mt. Wilson hillclimb and downhill, Sespe Hot Springs Two-Stage, and two supported tours: Pirú-Cuyamá Overland, and Haute Route. Victor was inducted into the Mountain Bike Hall of Fame in 1989.

Designer

Victor has created a multi-faceted body of work, ranging from coins to electronic jewelry, mountain bikes, human-powered vehicles, garments, posters, and graphic art.

Mountain bikes
His bicycle building years were from 1979 to 1991. In conjunction with Victor’s love of cycling, he designed various models of mountain bikes, beginning with 'Topanga!' in 1979 which featured 20” wheels with 1X7 gearing, followed by Palisadian in 1981 (24” wheels), VVA-26 Semi-Custom Dirt Road Bicycle in 1982 (26” wheels), Colt 20/20 in 1982 (20” wheels, a hillclimb-specific bicycle), and 1991 in 1991 (26” wheels).

Human-powered vehicles
Lured by the possibility of becoming the world's fastest human, Victor designed two machines. The first of these, Tachy Taxi (from Greek: "speed," and "travel"), he entered in the First International Human-Powered Vehicle Championships in 1975, where his crash into spectators ended his bid for glory. Later, in 1979, Tachy Taxi Two, which he designed to run on rails in order to eliminate all steering problems, crashed into the cameraman who was standing over the rails at the finish line, using a telephoto lens.

Author

The First Thing To Go (2018), a memoir
Water Before Tea (2016), an autobiography
Beyond 1991: A Dirt Road Rider's Trek Epic, and Other Dreams (1998) 
1991: Selected Verses (and Art) of Victor Vincente Of America (1979)
Coloring Book (1978)

Major results

Road racing

1957
 1st Southern California junior road championship

1958
 1st Tijuana - Tecate, Mexico
 2nd Southern California road championship
 1st All-California road championship

1959
 1st Tour du St-Laurent, Canada
 Member Pan American team, Chicago
 2nd Southern California road championship

1960
 1st Bouquet Canyon B.A.R.
 1st Tour of Somerville, New Jersey
 1st Olympic trials 100-kilometer time trial, teamed with Lars Zebroski
 11th Olympic Games, Rome, Italy, 100-kilometer team time trial

1961
 1st Circuito di Monsummano, Italy
 1st Quarrata, Italy
 1st San Casciano, Italy
 1st Calcinaia, Italy
 World Championship competitor, Bern, Switzerland

1962
 2nd Quebec - Montreal, Canada

1963
 1st Santa Monica Cycling Club 10-mile time trial championship, Malibu
 1st Santa Monica Cycling Club championship (clean sweep): road, sprint, and cyclocross
 2nd Pan American Games, São Paulo, Brazil, road race team placing

1964
 Member Olympic team, Tokyo, Japan
 1st Southern California road championship
 1st Santa Monica Cycling Club hillclimb championship, Piuma Canyon

1965
 1st Southern California road championship
 1st National Championship, Los Angeles, California
 1st North America hillclimb championship, Mt. Evans, Colorado
 World Championship competitor, San Sebastian, Spain

1966
 3rd Münster city track championship, Germany
 1st Circuito di Salsomaggiore, Italy
 1st Oltrarno, Italy
 World championship competitor at The Nürburgring, Nürburg, Germany

1967
 2nd São Caetano, Brazil

Mountain biking
1980
 1st Mt. Wilson hillclimb
 1st Sespe Hot Springs Two-Stage

1984
 1st Brian Skinner Widowmaker

1986
 1st Mt. Baldy (Mt. San Antonio) hillclimb

References

External links
 

1941 births
Living people
American male cyclists
Cyclists at the 1960 Summer Olympics
Cyclists at the 1964 Summer Olympics
Cyclists at the 1963 Pan American Games
Olympic cyclists of the United States
Pan American Games medalists in cycling
Pan American Games silver medalists for the United States
Cyclists from Los Angeles
Medalists at the 1963 Pan American Games